Francis Yoshihiro Fukuyama (born October 27, 1952) is an American political scientist, political economist, international relations scholar and writer. 

Fukuyama is known for his book The End of History and the Last Man (1992), which argues that the worldwide spread of liberal democracies and free-market capitalism of the West and its lifestyle may signal the end point of humanity's sociocultural evolution and political struggle and become the final form of human government, an assessment met with criticisms. In his subsequent book Trust: Social Virtues and Creation of Prosperity (1995), he modified his earlier position to acknowledge that culture cannot be cleanly separated from economics. Fukuyama is also associated with the rise of the neoconservative movement, from which he has since distanced himself.

Fukuyama has been a senior fellow at the Freeman Spogli Institute for International Studies since July 2010 and the Mosbacher Director of the Center on Democracy, Development and the Rule of Law at Stanford University. In August 2019, he was named director of the Ford Dorsey Master's in International Policy at Stanford.

Before that, he served as a professor and director of the International Development program at the School of Advanced International Studies of Johns Hopkins University. Previously, he was Omer L. and Nancy Hirst Professor of Public Policy at the School of Public Policy at George Mason University.

He is a council member of the International Forum for Democratic Studies founded by the National Endowment for Democracy and was a member of the Political Science Department of the RAND Corporation. He is also one of the 25 leading figures on the Information and Democracy Commission launched by Reporters Without Borders.

Early life
Francis Fukuyama was born in the Hyde Park neighborhood of Chicago, Illinois, United States. His paternal grandfather fled the Russo-Japanese War in 1905 and started a shop on the west coast before being incarcerated in the Second World War. His father, Yoshio Fukuyama, a second-generation Japanese American, was trained as a minister in the Congregational Church, received a doctorate in sociology from the University of Chicago, and taught religious studies. His mother, Toshiko Kawata Fukuyama, was born in Kyoto, Japan, and was the daughter of Shiro Kawata, founder of the Economics Department of Kyoto University and first president of Osaka City University. Francis, whose Japanese name is Yoshihiro, grew up in Manhattan as an only child, had little contact with Japanese culture, and did not learn Japanese. His family moved to State College, Pennsylvania, in 1967.

Education

Fukuyama received his Bachelor of Arts degree in classics from Cornell University, where he studied political philosophy under Allan Bloom. He initially pursued graduate studies in comparative literature at Yale University, going to Paris for six months to study under Roland Barthes and Jacques Derrida but became disillusioned and switched to political science at Harvard University. There, he studied with Samuel P. Huntington and Harvey Mansfield, among others. He earned his Ph.D. in political science at Harvard for his thesis on Soviet threats to intervene in the Middle East. In 1979, he joined the global policy think tank RAND Corporation.

Fukuyama lived at the Telluride House and has been affiliated with the Telluride Association since his undergraduate years at Cornell. Telluride is an education enterprise that has been home to other significant leaders and intellectuals, including Steven Weinberg, Paul Wolfowitz and Kathleen Sullivan.

Fukuyama was the Omer L. and Nancy Hirst Professor of Public Policy in the School of Public Policy at George Mason University from 1996 to 2000. Until July 10, 2010, he was the Bernard L. Schwartz Professor of International Political Economy and Director of the International Development Program at the Paul H. Nitze School of Advanced International Studies of Johns Hopkins University in Washington, D.C. He is now Olivier Nomellini Senior Fellow and resident in the Center on Democracy, Development, and the Rule of Law at the Freeman Spogli Institute for International Studies at Stanford University, and director of the Ford Dorsey Master's in International Policy at Stanford.

Scholarship

The End of History and the Last Man 

Fukuyama is best known as the author of The End of History and the Last Man, in which he argued that the progression of human history as a struggle between ideologies was largely at an end, with the world settling on liberal democracy after the end of the Cold War and the fall of the Berlin Wall in 1989. The book was an expansion on ideas expressed in an earlier article, "The End of History?" published in The National Interest. In the article, Fukuyama predicted the coming global triumph of political and economic liberalism:

Authors like Ralf Dahrendorf argued in 1990 that the essay gave Fukuyama his 15 minutes of fame, which would soon be followed by a slide into obscurity. However, Fukuyama remained a relevant and cited public intellectual, leading American communitarian Amitai Etzioni to declare him "one of the few enduring public intellectuals. They are often media stars who are eaten up and spat out after their 15 minutes. But he has lasted." Bernard Crick in his book titled Democracy spoke of Fukayama's principle of 'the end of the world' as being a poor misreading of the historical processes involved in the development of modern democracy.

According to Fukuyama, one of the main critiques of The End of History was of his aggressive stance towards postmodernism. Postmodern philosophy had, in Fukuyama's opinion, undermined the ideology behind liberal democracy, leaving the western world in a potentially weaker position. The fact that Marxism and fascism had proven untenable for practical use while liberal democracy still thrived was reason enough to embrace the hopeful attitude of the Progressive era, as this hope for the future was what made a society worth struggling to maintain. Postmodernism, which, by this time, had become embedded in the cultural consciousness, offered no hope and nothing to sustain a necessary sense of community, instead relying only on lofty intellectual premises.

The Origins of Political Order 

In the 2011 book, Fukuyama describes what makes a state stable, using comparative political history to develop a theory of the stability of a political system. According to Fukuyama, an ideal political order needs a modern and effective state, the rule of law governing the state and be accountable.

Political Order and Political Decay 

The 2014 book is the second book on political order, following the 2011 book The Origins of Political Order. In this book, Fukuyama covers events taking place since the French Revolution and sheds light on political institutions and their development in different regions.

After tracing how a modern and effective government was developed in the U.S., Fukuyama asserts that it is experiencing political decay. Fukuyama believes that political decay can be seen in the deterioration of bureaucracies, special interest groups capturing the legislature, and inevitable but cumbersome judicial processes challenging all types of government action.

Other works 
Fukuyama has written a number of other books, among them Trust: The Social Virtues and the Creation of Prosperity and Our Posthuman Future: Consequences of the Biotechnology Revolution. In the latter, he qualified his original "end of history" thesis, arguing that since biotechnology increasingly allows humans to control their own evolution, it may allow humans to alter human nature, thereby putting liberal democracy at risk. One possible outcome could be that an altered human nature could end in radical inequality. He is a fierce enemy of transhumanism, an intellectual movement asserting that posthumanity is a desirable goal.

In another work, The Great Disruption: Human Nature and the Reconstruction of Social Order, Fukuyama explores the origins of social norms, and analyses the current disruptions in the fabric of our moral traditions, which he considers as arising from a shift from the manufacturing to the information age. This shift is, he thinks, normal and will prove self-correcting, given the intrinsic human need for social norms and rules.

In 2006, in America at the Crossroads, Fukuyama discusses the history of neoconservatism, with particular focus on its major tenets and political implications. He outlines his rationale for supporting the Bush administration, as well as where he believes it has gone wrong.

In 2008, Fukuyama published the book Falling Behind: Explaining the Development Gap Between Latin America and the United States, which resulted from research and a conference funded by Grupo Mayan to gain understanding on why Latin America, once far wealthier than North America, fell behind in terms of development in only a matter of centuries. Discussing this book at a 2009 conference, Fukuyama outlined his belief that inequality within Latin American nations is a key impediment to growth. An unequal distribution of wealth, he stated, leads to social upheaval, which then results in stunted growth.

In 2018 in Identity: The Demand for Dignity and the Politics of Resentment Fukuyama enlists Plato's notion of thymos  in order to understand the politics of grievance and ressentiment.

At the start of the following decade, he published some reflections on his work in the form of conversations under the title After the End of History.

Political views

Neoconservatism
As a key Reagan Administration contributor to the formulation of the Reagan Doctrine, Fukuyama is an important figure in the rise of neoconservatism, although his works came out years after Irving Kristol's 1972 book crystallized neoconservatism. Fukuyama was active in the Project for the New American Century think tank starting in 1997, and as a member co-signed the organization's 1998 letter recommending that President Bill Clinton support Iraqi insurgencies in the overthrow of then-President of Iraq Saddam Hussein. He was also among forty co-signers of William Kristol's September 20, 2001 letter to President George W. Bush after the September 11, 2001 attacks that suggested the U.S. not only "capture or kill Osama bin Laden", but also embark upon "a determined effort to remove Saddam Hussein from power in Iraq".

As a supporter of the Iraq war Fukuyama defended the war against critics who accused the US of unilateralism and violating international law, saying "Americans are right to insist that there is no such thing as an 'international community' in the abstract, and that nation-states must ultimately look out for themselves when it comes to critical matters of security".

In a New York Times article from February 2006, Fukuyama, in considering the ongoing Iraq War, stated: "What American foreign policy needs is not a return to a narrow and cynical realism, but rather the formulation of a 'realistic Wilsonianism' that better matches means to ends." In regard to neoconservatism, he went on to say: "What is needed now are new ideas, neither neoconservative nor realist, for how America is to relate to the rest of the world – ideas that retain the neoconservative belief in the universality of human rights, but without its illusions about the efficacy of American power and hegemony to bring these ends about."

Current views
Fukuyama began to distance himself from the neoconservative agenda of the Bush administration, citing its excessive militarism and embrace of unilateral armed intervention, particularly in the Middle East. By mid-2004, Fukuyama had voiced his growing opposition to the Iraq War and called for Donald Rumsfeld's resignation as Secretary of Defense.

At an annual dinner of the American Enterprise Institute in February 2004, Dick Cheney and Charles Krauthammer declared the beginning of a unipolar era under American hegemony. "All of these people around me were cheering wildly," Fukuyama remembers. He believes that the Iraq War was being blundered. "All of my friends had taken leave of reality." He has not spoken to Paul Wolfowitz (previously a good friend) since.

Fukuyama declared he would not be voting for Bush, and that the Bush administration had made three mistakes:
 Overstating the threat of Islamist extremism to the US.
 Failing to foresee the fierce negative reaction to its "benevolent hegemony". From the very beginning showing a negative attitude toward the United Nations and other intergovernmental organizations and not seeing that it would increase anti-Americanism in other countries.
 Misjudging what was needed to bring peace in Iraq and being overly optimistic about the success with which social engineering of western values could be applied to Iraq and the Middle East in general.

Fukuyama believes the US has a right to promote its own values in the world, but more along the lines of what he calls "realistic Wilsonianism", with military intervention only as a last resort and only in addition to other measures. A latent military force is more likely to have an effect than actual deployment. The US spends 43% of global military spending, but Iraq shows there are limits to its effectiveness.

The US should instead stimulate political and economic development and gain a better understanding of what happens in other countries. The best instruments are setting a good example and providing education and, in many cases, money. The secret of development, be it political or economic, is that it never comes from outsiders, but always from people in the country itself. One thing the US proved to have excelled in during the aftermath of World War II was the formation of international institutions. A return to support for these structures would combine American power with international legitimacy, but such measures require a lot of patience. This is the central thesis of his 2006 work America at the Crossroads.

In a 2006 essay in The New York Times Magazine strongly critical of the invasion, he identified neoconservatism with Leninism. He wrote that neoconservatives "believed that history can be pushed along with the right application of power and will. Leninism was a tragedy in its Bolshevik version, and it has returned as farce when practiced by the United States. Neoconservatism, as both a political symbol and a body of thought, has evolved into something I can no longer support."

Fukuyama announced the end of the neoconservative moment and argued for the demilitarization of the War on Terrorism:

Fukuyama endorsed Barack Obama in the 2008 US presidential election. He states:

In 2007 Fukuyama criticized the American government's attitude to Iran, “If the only thing we're putting on the table is that we'll talk to you, it isn't going to work..What the Iranians have really wanted over a long period of time is the grand bargain". In 2009 he described Iran as "not quite a tyranny, petty or grand" but also not a liberal democracy and added that "Iran could evolve towards a genuine rule-of-law democracy within the broad parameters of the 1979 constitution".

In a 2018 interview with New Statesman, when asked about his views on the resurgence of socialist politics in the United States and the United Kingdom, he responded:

In a review for The Washington Post, Fukuyama discussed Ezra Klein's 2020 book Why We're Polarized regarding US politics, and outlined Klein's central conclusion about the importance of race and white identity to Donald Trump voters and Republicans.

In 2020, Fukuyama became the chair of the editorial board for American Purpose, a magazine established in 2020 to promote three central ideas. Firstly, it wants to promote liberal democracy in the United States. Secondly, it seeks to understand and opine on the challenges to liberal democracy in other countries. Thirdly, it wants to "offer criticism and commentary on history and biography, high art and pop culture, science and technology."

Fukuyama has also perceived Joe Biden's victory in the 2020 presidential election as the result of the Western system's ability to correct mistakes.

Views following Russian invasion of Ukraine
Following the Russian invasion of Ukraine in February 2022, Fukuyama made several prognoses in the magazine American Purpose:

 Russia is heading for an outright defeat in Ukraine. Russian planning was incompetent, based on a flawed assumption that Ukrainians were favorable to Russia and that their military would collapse immediately following an invasion.
 The collapse of their position could be sudden and catastrophic, rather than happening slowly through a war of attrition.
 There is no diplomatic solution to the war possible prior to this happening. There is no conceivable compromise that would be acceptable to both Russia and Ukraine given the losses they have taken at this point.
 Russian President Vladimir Putin will not survive the defeat of his army. He gets support because he is perceived to be a strongman; what does he have to offer once he demonstrates incompetence and is stripped of his coercive power?
 The invasion has already done huge damage to populists all over the world, who prior to the attack uniformly expressed sympathy for Putin. That includes Matteo Salvini, Jair Bolsonaro, Éric Zemmour, Marine Le Pen, Viktor Orbán, and of course Donald Trump. The politics of the war has exposed their openly authoritarian leanings.
 Drones will become increasingly critical in the battlefield.
 A Russian defeat will make possible a "new birth of freedom," and get us out of our funk about the declining state of global democracy. The spirit of 1989 will live on, thanks to a bunch of brave Ukrainians.

Fukuyama has also put emphasis on the importance of national identity for a sound defense of liberal values—and thus the need to reconcile the nation-state with liberal universalism, even if they seem at odds at first—in a Foreign Affairs article:

Liberalism, with its universalist pretensions, may sit uneasily alongside seemingly parochial nationalism, but the two can be reconciled. The goals of liberalism are entirely compatible with a world divided into nation-states. . . . Liberal rights are meaningless if they cannot be enforced by a state . . . The territorial jurisdiction of a state necessarily corresponds to the area occupied by the group of individuals who signed on to the social contract. People living outside that jurisdiction must have their rights respected, but not necessarily enforced, by that state. . . . The need for international cooperation in addressing issues such as global warming and pandemics has never been more evident. But it remains the case that one particular form of power, the ability to enforce rules through the threat or the actual use of force, remains under the control of nation-states. . . . Ultimate power, in other words, continues to be the province of nation-states, which means that the control of power at this level remains critical. . . . There is thus no necessary contradiction between liberal universalism and the need for nation-states. Although the normative value of human rights may be universal, enforcement power is not; it is a scarce resource that is necessarily applied in a territorially delimited way.

Affiliations
 Between 2006 and 2008, Fukuyama advised Muammar Gaddafi as part of the Monitor Group, a consultancy firm based in Cambridge, MA.
 In August 2005, Fukuyama co-founded The American Interest, a bimonthly magazine devoted to the broad theme of "America in the World". He served as chairman of the editorial board until his resignation. In a published letter posted on his public Medium page on July 27, 2020, Fukuyama cited a disagreement with the publisher's decision to terminate Jeff Gedmin as editor-in-chief. Fukuyama also indicated other changes underway at the publication as an additional reason for his resignation.
 Fukuyama was a member of the RAND Corporation's Political Science Department from 1979 to 1980, 1983 to 1989, and 1995 to 1996. He is now a member of the board of trustees.
 Fukuyama was a member of the President's Council on Bioethics from 2001 to 2004.
 Fukuyama is a Fellow of the World Academy of Art and Science (WAAS).
 Fukuyama was on the steering committee for the Scooter Libby Legal Defense Trust. Fukuyama is a long-time friend of Libby. They served together in the State Department in the 1980s.
 Fukuyama is a member of the Board of Counselors for the Pyle Center of Northeast Asian Studies at the National Bureau of Asian Research.
 Fukuyama is on the board of Global Financial Integrity.
 Fukuyama is a member of the Inter-American Dialogue.
Fukuyama is the chair of the editorial board for American Purpose, a magazine established in 2020.
 Fukuyama is a member of the International Advisory Board for Bellingcat.

Personal life
Fukuyama is a part-time photographer. He also has an interest in early American furniture, which he reproduces by hand. Another hobby of Fukuyama's is sound recording and reproduction. He explained, "These days I seem to spend as much time thinking about gear as I do analyzing politics for my day job." Since the mid-1990s, Fukuyama has been building his own personal computers.

Fukuyama is married to Laura Holmgren, whom he met when she was a University of California in Los Angeles graduate student after he started working for the RAND Corporation. He dedicated his book Trust: The Social Virtues and the Creation of Prosperity to her. They live in California, with their three children, Julia, David, and John.

He is the first cousin to crime novelist Joe Ide. Fukuyama helped him get his first book published.

Selected bibliography

Scholarly works
 The Soviet Union and Iraq since 1968. RAND Corporation (1980).

Books

 The End of History and the Last Man. Free Press, 1992. 
 Trust: The Social Virtues and the Creation of Prosperity. Free Press, 1995. 
 The Great Disruption: Human Nature and the Reconstitution of Social Order. Free Press. 1999. 
 Our Posthuman Future: Consequences of the Biotechnology Revolution. New York, NY: Farrar, Straus and Giroux. 2002. 
 State-Building: Governance and World Order in the 21st century. Ithaca, NY: Cornell University Press. 2004. 
 America at the Crossroads: Democracy, Power, and the Neoconservative Legacy. New Haven, CT: Yale University Press. 2006.  US editionAfter the Neo Cons: Where the Right went Wrong. London: Profile Books. 2006.  UK edition
 Falling Behind: Explaining the Development Gap Between Latin America and the United States (editor). New York, NY: Oxford University Press. 2008. 
 The Origins of Political Order: From Prehuman Times to the French Revolution. New York, NY: Farrar, Straus and Giroux. 2011. 
 Political Order and Political Decay: From the Industrial Revolution to the Present Day. New York: Farrar, Straus and Giroux. 2014. 
 Identity: The Demand for Dignity and the Politics of Resentment, New York: Farrar, Straus and Giroux. 2018.
 Liberalism and Its Discontents, New York: Farrar, Straus and Giroux. 2022.

Essays
 "The End of History?" The National Interest, no. 16 (Summer 1989).
 "Women and the Evolution of World Politics." Foreign Affairs (Oct. 1998).
 "Immigrants and Family Values." The Immigration Reader (1998). .
 "Human Nature and the Reconstruction of Social Order." The Atlantic Monthly (May 1999).
 "Social Capital and Civil Society." Paper prepared for delivery at the International Monetary Fund Conference on Second Generation Reforms (Oct. 1, 1999).
 "The Neoconservative Moment." The National Interest (Summer 2004).
 "After Neoconservatism." New York Times Magazine (Feb. 19, 2006).
 "Supporter's Voice Now Turns on Bush." New York Times Magazine (Mar. 14, 2006).
 "Why Shouldn't I Change My Mind?"  Los Angeles Times (Apr. 9, 2006).
 "The Fall of America, Inc." Newsweek (Oct. 13, 2008).
 "The New Nationalism and the Strategic Architecture of Northeast Asia." Asia Policy (Jan. 2007)
 "Left Out." The American Interest (Jan. 2011).
 "Is China Next?" The Wall Street Journal (Mar. 12, 2011).
 "The Future of History: Can Liberal Democracy Survive the Decline of the Middle Class?" Foreign Affairs (Jan./Feb. 2012).
 "What is Governance?" Governance (Mar. 2013).
 "Against Identity Politics: The New Tribalism and the Crisis of Democracy." Foreign Affairs (Sep./Oct. 2018).
 "Liberalism and Its Discontents: The Challenges from the Left and the Right." American Purpose (Oct. 2020).
 "Still the End of History." The Atlantic (Oct. 2022).
 See Ronald T. Libby, "The Death of Political Science and Rebirth of Politics."

See also
 Biopolitics
 High trust and low trust societies
 Brave New World argument
 Obama Republican
 Vetocracy

References

External links

 
 Francis Fukuyama's blog at American Purpose
 Islam and America... Friends or Foes?
 
In Depth interview with Fukuyama, March 5, 2006
 ANU Public Lecture Series MP3 of a public lecture by Fukuyama titled The Missing Dimension of Stateness delivered at The Australian National University, December 15, 2006
 Francis Fukuyama explains his last book: "The Origins of Political Order"
 

1952 births
20th-century American economists
20th-century American historians
20th-century American male writers
20th-century American non-fiction writers
20th-century American philosophers
20th-century political scientists
20th-century social scientists
21st-century American economists
21st-century American historians
21st-century American male writers
21st-century American non-fiction writers
21st-century American philosophers
21st-century political scientists
21st-century social scientists
American academics of Japanese descent
American economists
American male bloggers
American male essayists
American male non-fiction writers
American non-fiction environmental writers
American people of Japanese descent
American philosophers
American photographers
American political philosophers
American political scientists
American political writers
American social commentators
American social sciences writers
American social scientists
American sociologists
American technology writers
American writers of Japanese descent
Center for Global Development
Contemporary philosophers
Cornell University alumni
Criticism of transhumanism
Critics of neoconservatism
Critics of postmodernism
Economic sociologists
Economists from California
George Mason University faculty
Harvard Graduate School of Arts and Sciences alumni
American international relations scholars
Johns Hopkins University faculty
Literacy and society theorists
Living people
Members of the Inter-American Dialogue
Philosophers of culture
Philosophers of economics
Philosophers of history
Philosophers of social science
Philosophers of technology
Philosophers of war
Political liberals (international relations)
Political sociologists
RAND Corporation people
Social philosophers
Stanford University faculty
Theorists on Western civilization
Writers about activism and social change
Writers about globalization
Writers from Chicago